The Bolivarian Military Technical Academy COL Juan Vicente Bolívar y Ponte (in Spanish Academia Técnica Militar Bolivariana), is an academy to train officers of technical and administrative services in the National Bolivarian Armed Forces of Venezuela.

Formerly the Armed Forces Basic School, it was given its current charter and was renamed to its present name in 2010, with its main campus in Maracay with branches in Caracas, Michelena and Caita La Mar.

Brief History 
In 1991, the Federal Government established the Armed Forces Basic School (Escuela Basica de la FF. AA. Nacionales, ESCUBAFAN, later on ESCUBAFANB) which served as a College-preparatory school preparing male and female graduates of high schools, public, private and military, for studies in the military academies after 2 years of education.

As part of the modernization and expansion of the armed forces to meet the challenges of the 21st century, then president Hugo Chávez transformed the Basic School to become the Technical Officers' Military Institute (Instituto de Formación de Oficiales Técnicos de la Fuerza Armada Nacional Bolivariana), with a four-year course for officers of the technical and administrative services of the National Armed Forces, in accordance with amendments to the Armed Forces Law made on 31 July 2008. This new institution merged the Basic School with the warrant officer schools which had then been closed as part of the transformation of the warrant officer corps to become the then brand new technical officer corps of the NBAF.

On 10 March 2009, the academy was granted a new charter, renamed as the Technical Officer's School (Escuela de Formación de Oficiales Técnicos, EFOTEC). Its current name and charter was given in 2010 when the Military University was founded.

Each of the schools under the BMTA system have long and distinguished histories of their own.

Organization of the BMTA system 

In 2019–2020, the BMTA was reorganized into four service-specialty and two occupational specialty schools:

 Army Technical Academy, Air Force Technical Academy, Armed Forces Communications and Electronics College, Health Sciences Academy and HQ Military Technical Academy - Maracay
 Naval Technical Academy - Caita La Mar
 National Guard Technical Academy - Michelena
 Health Sciences Academy - Caracas

Curriculum 
The BMTA is a medium-sized, highly residential baccalaureate college, with a full-time, four-year undergraduate program (five years for medical officers, 3 years for civilians in the communications courses) that emphasizes instruction in the arts, sciences, and professions with no graduate program.

As all its military cadets are commissioned as second lieutenants and ensigns in the technical services upon graduation, military and leadership education is nested with academic instruction in the following specialties and subjects:

 Navigation
 Hydrology
 Geography
 Industrial production and manufacture
 Military security and sciences
 Air power
 Logistics
 Information technology and electronics
 Finance
 Transport
 Health and Medicine
 Engineering
 Electrical engineering
 Environmental studies

All the military officer cadets of the academy, aside from their officer's commission, receive a Bachelor of Science degree upon graduation regardless of their major. The academy is accredited as a public education institution by the Ministry of Higher Education.

The civilian students in the communications course receive an associate degree in Electronics and Communications after three years' study.

References

External links
 Official webpage

Bolivarian Military University of Venezuela